"Stay the Night" is a song by Swedish pop group Alcazar. The song was an entry in Melodifestivalen 2009 for the Eurovision Song Contest 2009, where it reached the March 14 final in Globen Arena after a public televote. Having placed 3rd with the regional juries and 4th in the televote, the song finished 5th overall. "Stay the Night" is the third single on Alcazar's 2009 album Disco Defenders.

Formats and track listings
These are the formats and track listings of promotional single releases of "Stay the Night".

CD single
"Radio Edit" - 3:02
"Karaoke Version" - 3:02

Digital Download
"Stay the Night" (Radio Edit) - 3:02

Chart performance
The song made its debut on Swedish Singles Charts at number 33 on March 6, 2009 and it managed to peak at number two the next week. As of the April 24, 2009 Charts, the song has charted for eight weeks with its most recent position being number nine. The song also charted on the Swedish Airplay Chart, peaking at number one for four weeks.

See also
Melodifestivalen 2009

External links
Alcazar Official Website

References

Alcazar (band) songs
Melodifestivalen songs of 2009
2009 singles
2009 songs
Songs written by Anders Hansson (songwriter)
Universal Records singles